"Save Your Tears" is a song by Canadian singer the Weeknd, from his fourth studio album, After Hours (2020). The Weeknd wrote and produced the song with Max Martin and Oscar Holter, with Belly and DaHeala receiving additional writing credits. The record was met with universal acclaim, with praise for The Weeknd's vocals.

Globally "Save Your Tears" peaked at number one in 18 countries while going top 10 in 33 others. The song was released as the album's fourth and final single on August 9, 2020, in Europe and November 24, 2020, in the US. A remix of the track by Oneohtrix Point Never was officially released alongside the deluxe edition of its parent album on March 23, 2020. "Save Your Tears" was the best-performing global single of 2021, earning 2.15 billion subscription stream equivalents globally, according to the International Federation of the Phonographic Industry (IFPI). It was also the 5th best-performing global single of 2022 with 1.32 billion subscription stream equivalents.

Initially, the original solo version of "Save Your Tears" peaked at number four on the US Billboard Hot 100, before its second remix, a collaboration with American singer Ariana Grande, propelled the song to number one on the Billboard Hot 100; it marked both artists' sixth number-one single on the chart. This also made After Hours the first album since Drake's Scorpion in 2018 to have three singles from the same album to reach number one. "Save Your Tears" spent two weeks atop the Billboard Hot 100.

Background and promotion
On July 12, 2019, a snippet of the track appeared online, leading many to believe that it was set to appear on After Hours. On March 17, 2020, the music-identifying app Shazam revealed that the record would be the eleventh song on the Weeknd's fourth studio album. Later that day, the Weeknd confirmed the piece's presence as the album's track list was released.

Lyrics and composition

According to the sheet music published at Musicnotes.com by Kobalt Music Group, the record is written in the key of C Major with an Allegro moderato tempo of 118 beats per minute. The Weeknd's vocal range spans from the low note of G3 to the high note of A4.

Complexs Joyce Ng summarized the song: "Its production billows into an array of bright synths and ominous melodies. Lyrically, the Weeknd appears self reflective as he atones for his past. Ultimately, 'Save Your Tears' feels like the narrative arc of what the Weeknd envisioned for his reclusive protagonist all along, now emerging from the darkness but failing to resist temptation".

Critical reception
"Save Your Tears" received universal acclaim. Billboard hailed the song as the best track on After Hours, stating: "Although 'Save Your Tears' is one of the most pop-driven songs on the album, the Weeknd doesn't hold back when it comes to the rather cold nature he usually finds himself adopting when it comes to his lovers. The production remains upbeat and steady the entire time, thanks to work from Max Martin, Oscar Holter, DaHeala, and The Weeknd himself, combining the best of his old content and some newer, more mainstream-driven sounds". Craig Jenkins of Vulture raved, "The Weeknd perfects the kitschy '80s genre experiment with 'Save Your Tears', a gutting breakup tune gorgeous and simple enough to stand alongside peak '80s pop like the Cars' 'You Might Think' (and slick enough to swipe a bit of melody from Wham!'s 'Everything She Wants' in the chorus). The piece concocts sound informed by both trap and dance music, encased in dense atmospherics, and heavy on crisp, bright keys". "'Save Your Tears' has both tonal echoes of Depeche Mode's melancholy and a nod to 'Everything She Wants' by Wham!, exhibiting shimmery mid-80s luxuriance", praised The New York Times editor Jon Caramanica.

Slant columnist Seth Wilson observed, "'Save Your Tears' revels in spite, flaunting how over-it Tesfaye is in front of his ex while teasing the possibility of reconciliation. Tesfaye's distinct brand of R&B consistently draws from other genres, but hearing him embrace a straight-up synth-rock sound here is an exciting change of pace". "He draws on synth-pop nostalgia to mirror the tragic glitz of '80s Hollywood: the plinking synths and slick hand-claps of 'Save Your Tears' evokes a long-lost Wham! track. His bleeding-heart melodies and unforgettable hooks remind us why we keep listening to the '80s first place", exclaimed Pitchfork writer Isabella Herrera. Jem Aswad of Variety commented, "'Save Your Tears', which could have been an MTV staple in the early '80s, is begging for period-appropriate videos. The record has thwacking electronic percussion and the vocoder hearkening back to Electric Light Orchestra's 'Mr. Blue Sky'".

Mark Richardson from The Wall Street Journal asserted that "'Save Your Tears' includes soaring melodies that provide ample opportunity for Mr. Tesfaye to show off his vocal range, being used on television singing competitions. By design, it is big and broad, less specific lyrically and further from the shadowy persona at the heart of the Weeknd—Mr. Tesfaye often seems downright affable here. Mr. Martin and the Weeknd show the influence of 1980s synth pop. The piece sounds like something from a John Hughes soundtrack". Michael Cragg from Vogue UK praised the record as "the sort of synth experimentation last heard in 1984 on The NeverEnding Story soundtrack". GQs Zak Maoui applauded "Save Your Tears" as one of the Weeknd's "best musical offerings to date". Apple Music applauded the composition, "Few things about 'Save Your Tears' mark it as a breakup song: For one, the production is drenched in bright, '80s-style synths that sound more glamorous than forlorn. Yet the Weeknd manages to imbue the single with a sense of heartbroken remorse, a rare emotion in his arsenal. Many came to love him through his more shadowy offerings, but there's no denying the power he brings to the nostalgic, splashy pop style he exhibits here". IFPI Chief Executive, Frances Moore has stated, "It has been another brilliant year for 'The Weeknd' and 'Save Your Tears' has unquestionably been one of the world's most loved songs."

Accolades

Commercial performance
Following the release of its parent album, "Save Your Tears" debuted at number 41 on the US Billboard Hot 100, dated April 4, 2020. The record reached number 4, becoming the third top five hit from the album. On June 17, 2021, "Save Your Tears" was awarded a 3x Platinum certification from the Recording Industry Association of America (RIAA) for selling three million units in the United States. On April 24, the song reached number one on the Billboard Mainstream Top 40 chart, where it led for four consecutive weeks.

Following the release of the remix with Ariana Grande, the song reached the top of the Billboard Hot 100 on the issue dated May 8, 2021. It became the sixth number-one hit of both the Weeknd and Grande (the latter of whom was credited on the track on the chart for the first time, as the remix drew the majority of the title's overall activity in the tracking week). Additionally, it also topped the Billboard Digital Song Sales chart, becoming Grande's eighth and the Weeknd's sixth chart-topping single. With eight number-one singles each, Grande joined Lady Gaga as a female artist with the fifth-most number-one singles on the Billboard Digital Song Sales Chart.

The Weeknd also became the first artist since Drake to earn three number-one singles from one album following his recent singles from After Hours, "Heartless" and "Blinding Lights" reaching number one. He also became the first artist to have three number ones from one album in three different years since Janet Jackson's album Janet Jackson's Rhythm Nation 1814. Joining Paul McCartney, Grande became just the second act and the first woman to earn three number-one duets in Billboard Hot 100 history. This was also Grande's third number-one duet within a year's span making her the artist with the fastest accumulation of three chart-topping duets. It remained at number one for a second consecutive week, drawing 22.4 million streams, 68.5 million radio airplay and 9,600 downloads on the week ending May 9, 2021.

Following the release of the remix with Grande, the song also peaked at the top spot of the Billboard Global 200, becoming the Weeknd's first and Grande's second number-one single. It also became the first male-female duet to reach the number one position. Joining BTS, Grande became just the second act and the first woman to earn multiple number-one hits on the Billboard Global 200 Chart. Joining Drake, Justin Bieber and BTS, Grande also became just the fourth act and the first woman to earn at least four top ten hits on Billboard Global 200 survey. Additionally, it reached a new peak of number two on the Billboard Global Excl. U.S. chart. On May 15, the song reached number one on Adult Pop Songs chart, where it led for 5 consecutive weeks. "Save Your Tears" has spent 27 weeks in the top ten of the Billboard Hot 100.

On the Rolling Stone Top 100 Songs chart, the song peaked at number 2 following the release of the Ariana Grande remix.

In the singer's native country of Canada, "Save Your Tears" reached number 46 on the Canadian Hot 100 following its parent album's release. After its release as a single, it peaked at number two for five non-consecutive weeks before rising to number one following the release of the Ariana Grande remix on the issue dated May 8, 2021, becoming the sixth number one hit of both the Weeknd and Grande. It became the second chart-topper from the parent album After Hours, after its biggest hit single "Blinding Lights". Additionally, it also topped the Canadian Digital Songs Sales chart.

In the United Kingdom, "Save Your Tears" peaked at number 2 on the UK Singles Chart.

In Australia, "Save Your Tears" peaked at number 3 on the ARIA Charts.

"Save Your Tears" reached number one in Belgium, Croatia, Denmark, Israel, Lithuania, Malaysia, Mexico, Poland, Serbia, Singapore, and Slovenia. It also reached the top 5 in Austria, Chile, the Czech Republic, Finland, Germany, Greece, Hungary, Iceland, Ireland, Italy, Norway, Portugal, Romania, Slovakia, Sweden, and Switzerland. Additionally, it reached the top 10 in Argentina, Bolivia, El Salvador, France, Honduras, Puerto Rico, New Zealand, Russia, and Uruguay.

Music video

Background

Prosthetic Renaissance Makeup-FX Studio designer Mike Marino crafted the signature look resembling plastic surgery. The process commenced as he shaped a general sculpture of the Weeknd's modified visage, then created the prosthetics. Four primary prosthetic components were involved: one for each lip; one for the nose, eyebrows, and forehead; and one for the cheeks and chin. After they were applied to the Weeknd's face, makeup was utilized to make them blend in.

Release and synopsis

The official music video for "Save Your Tears" was first teased by The Weeknd as being on its way through his social media platforms on January 4, 2021. It was released the following day.

Directed by Cliqua, the video sees the Weeknd wearing a diamond-adorned version of his original red-jacketed outfit. The bruises on his face are no longer present, although his character has apparently undergone a bizarre plastic surgery. He performs in a lavish nightclub occupied by formally attired members wearing glittery, full-face masks that pay homage to scenes from Stanley Kubrick's final film, Eyes Wide Shut; his backing band is also wearing masks. He wanders out into the motionless, seated crowd, guzzling one person's champagne and laying his arm on the head of another until he notices a gorgeously brilliant, maskless woman in the audience (played by Bianca Rojas) and guides her onstage. While they initially are dancing joyfully, the camera soon reveals that the Weeknd is hiding a pistol behind his back. The lights go out and when the lights are turned back on, the Weeknd has placed his gun in one of her hands with him pointing the gun at his own head. The woman realizes this and shrieks. The scene concludes with the Weeknd holding the pistol to his own head. As the song finishes, he pulls the trigger, releasing confetti. The assembly applauds enthusiastically.

Reception
The music video received widely positive reviews from critics. Rolling Stone journalist Jon Blistein exclaimed, "The Weeknd delivers an exuberant rendition of 'Save Your Tears' to a lifeless, buttoned-up crowd all wearing party masks". Variety columnist Jen Aswad stated, "It's a fitting, more than slightly disturbing and suitably bizarre continuation in a series of highly unconventional promotional videos". Editor Starr Bowenbank of Cosmopolitan asserted, "The Weeknd continues to deliver high-quality content…and his newest offering, the music video for 'Save Your Tears' is no exception".

The aforementioned prosthetic led to the formation of memes and saw the Weeknd compared to Handsome Squidward.

Hidden symbolism referencing the Grammys and the recent controversial snub that occurred to him at the time of the clip's release, was also notably picked up.
The music video has received more than one billion views on YouTube.

Live performances
The song's debut live performance occurred during the American Music Awards of 2020 on November 22, 2020, where it was performed alongside the Kenny G remix of "In Your Eyes" in downtown Los Angeles. In his performance, the Weeknd sported a bandaged look that continued the narrative of the visuals that he released for After Hours.

In August 2020, the song was one of the tracks featured on TikTok's virtual concert: The Weeknd Experience. It served as the AR livestream's closing track.

On February 7, 2021, "Save Your Tears" was performed halfway through Tesfaye's performance at the Super Bowl LV halftime show at Raymond James Stadium in Tampa.

On May 11, 2021, the Weeknd performed at the Brit Awards. Decked out in a sailor-style raincoat, the Weeknd crooned "Save Your Tears" in a brightly lit, sparse box as thunder and lightning raged above him. Toward the end of the song, he wandered out of the box to finish singing in the rain.

On May 27, 2021, the Weeknd serenaded the audience with the "Save Your Tears" remix featuring Grande at the iHeartRadio Music Awards. The musician was dressed in a sleek black suit against a glittery background. Later, Grande appeared in a silky purple gown. She dazzled alongside the Weeknd before adorning the bridge with her whistle notes. The artists concluded in a dual arranged chorus finale.

Remixes

OPN remix
The record's official remix was created by OPN and is included in the original deluxe edition of After Hours and the remix EP After Hours (Remixes). Salvatore Maicki of The Fader praised the collaboration: "On the OPN remix of 'Save Your Tears', they meet in the middle, igniting a technicolor spectacle".

Ariana Grande remix

The second remix, a collaboration with American singer Ariana Grande, was released on April 22, 2021, with an accompanying animated music video. The song marks the third collaboration between the Weeknd and Grande, after "Love Me Harder" (2014) and "Off the Table" (2020).

Reception
The second remix garnered universal acclaim. Billboard staff member Katie Atkinson complimented, "Ariana Grande brings her ethereal vocals to the song". "The Weeknd and Ariana Grande's third collaboration will have you smiling all year long", Billboard journalist Gab Ginsberg exclaimed. Natalia Barr of The Wall Street Journal hailed it as one of the best new pop records, "the two singers have reunited on an updated piece from the Weeknd's new wave-inspired album from last year, After Hours. Grande adds her sultry vocals to the song's second verse and chorus". NME columnist Will Lavin noted, "Grande adds a fresh and husky verse of her own to the remix".

Monica Sisavat from PopSugar described the remix as pure perfection, "Let's just say their voices together are just chef's kiss." "The pair's vocals intermingle on the wistful, synth-laden track as they harmonize," Rolling Stone editor Althea Legaspi stated. Apple Music celebrated the composition, "'Save Your Tears' is just as dreamy and lush as the 2020 original, but Grande's vocal acrobatics lend it a new dynamic—it's a duet now, two former lovers looking up at the same night sky, talking back and forth at a distance".

The song is featured in the 2021 dance video game Just Dance 2022. The remix also earned six Billboard Music Awards nominations.

The remix has been streamed over 1 billion times on Spotify as of January 2023.

Personnel
Credits adapted from Billboard.

 The Weeknd – songwriting, vocals, production, programming, keyboards, bass, guitar, drums
 Belly – songwriting
 Jason Quenneville – songwriting
 Max Martin – songwriting, production, programming, keyboards, bass, guitar, drums
 Oscar Holter – songwriting, production, programming, keyboards, bass, guitar, drums
 Michael Ilbert – engineering
 Sam Holland – engineering
 Shin Kamiyama – engineering
 Cory Bice – engineering assistant
 Jeremy Lertola – engineering assistant
 Sean Klein – engineering assistant
 Serban Ghenea – mixing
 John Hanes – engineering for mixing
 Dave Kutch – mastering
 Kevin Peterson – mastering
 Ariana Grande - songwriting, vocals, production, vocal production, engineering (Ariana Grande remix only)

Charts

Weekly charts

Year-end charts

Certifications

Release history

See also 

 List of Billboard Global 200 number ones of 2021
 List of Billboard Argentina Hot 100 top-ten singles in 2021
 List of Australian top-ten singles of 2021
 List of Ultratop 50 number-one singles of 2021
 List of Canadian Hot 100 number-one singles of 2021
 List of number-one hits of 2021 (Denmark)
 List of number-one songs of 2021 (Malaysia)
 List of number-one singles of 2021 (Poland)
 List of number-one songs of 2021 (Singapore)
 List of number-one singles of 2021 (Slovenia)
 List of UK top-ten singles of 2021
 List of Billboard Hot 100 number-one singles of 2021
 List of Adult Top 40 number-one songs of the 2020s
 List of Billboard Mainstream Top 40 number-one songs of 2021

Notes

References

External links
  
 
 

2020 songs
2020 singles
The Weeknd songs
Number-one singles in Denmark
Number-one singles in Israel
Number-one singles in Malaysia
Number-one singles in Poland
Number-one singles in Singapore
Ultratop 50 Singles (Flanders) number-one singles
Ultratop 50 Singles (Wallonia) number-one singles
Song recordings produced by Max Martin
Song recordings produced by the Weeknd
Songs written by the Weeknd
Songs written by Belly (rapper)
Songs written by DaHeala
Songs written by Max Martin
Songs written by Oscar Holter
Republic Records singles
XO (record label) singles
Canadian synth-pop songs
Synthwave songs